The meridian 127° west of Greenwich is a line of longitude that extends from the North Pole across the Arctic Ocean, North America, the Pacific Ocean, the Southern Ocean, and Antarctica to the South Pole.

The 127th meridian west forms a great circle with the 53rd meridian east.

From Pole to Pole
Starting at the North Pole and heading south to the South Pole, the 127th meridian west passes through:

{| class="wikitable plainrowheaders"
! scope="col" width="130" | Co-ordinates
! scope="col" | Country, territory or sea
! scope="col" | Notes
|-
| style="background:#b0e0e6;" | 
! scope="row" style="background:#b0e0e6;" | Arctic Ocean
| style="background:#b0e0e6;" |
|-
| style="background:#b0e0e6;" | 
! scope="row" style="background:#b0e0e6;" | Beaufort Sea
| style="background:#b0e0e6;" |
|-
| style="background:#b0e0e6;" | 
! scope="row" style="background:#b0e0e6;" | Amundsen Gulf
| style="background:#b0e0e6;" |
|-valign="top"
| 
! scope="row" | 
| Northwest Territories Yukon — from  British Columbia — from 
|-
| style="background:#b0e0e6;" | 
! scope="row" style="background:#b0e0e6;" | Queen Charlotte Strait
| style="background:#b0e0e6;" |
|-valign="top"
| 
! scope="row" | 
| British Columbia — Malcolm Island and Vancouver Island
|-
| style="background:#b0e0e6;" | 
! scope="row" style="background:#b0e0e6;" | Pacific Ocean
| style="background:#b0e0e6;" |
|-
| style="background:#b0e0e6;" | 
! scope="row" style="background:#b0e0e6;" | Southern Ocean
| style="background:#b0e0e6;" |
|-
| 
! scope="row" | Antarctica
| Unclaimed territory
|-
|}

See also
126th meridian west
128th meridian west

w127 meridian west